The Scott Point site, also known as 20MK22 or (erroneously) as the Point Patterson site, is an archaeological site located near the shore of Lake Michigan near Scott Point, south of Gould City, Michigan and west of Point Patterson. It was listed on the National Register of Historic Places in 1976.

Description
The adjacent shoreline is relatively rocky, making this bay the best canoe landing place in the immediate area.

The site was once a Late Woodland period village, with groupings of fire-damaged rocks indicating the locations of hearths.  Pottery sherds, flint arrowheads and scrapers, hammerstones, and bone tools were collected at the site.  The site also included numerous fish remains, as well as the remains of deer, moose, and beaver.  The site was likely a seasonal fall fishing village similar to the nearby Juntunen site.  A nearby burial site, designated 20MK450, may have been associated with this village.

History
The Scott Point site was examined by archaeologist George Quimby multiple times in the early 1960s.

References

Further reading

Geography of Mackinac County, Michigan
Archaeological sites on the National Register of Historic Places in Michigan
National Register of Historic Places in Mackinac County, Michigan